William Daniels (born 1927) is an American actor.

William Daniels may also refer to:

 William Daniels (artist) (born 1976), British painter
 William Daniels (automotive engineer) (1912–2004), British car engineer
 William Daniels (cinematographer) (1901–1970), American cinematographer
 William Antonio Daniels or Kiing Shooter (1992–2020), American rapper
 William B. Daniels (1817–1894), pioneer in Oregon Territory, and in Idaho Territory
 William Henry Daniels (1855–1897), Hawaiian judge and politician
 William Randall Daniels or Billy Dee (born 1951), American pornographic actor

See also
Will Daniels (born 1986), American basketball player
Bill Daniels (disambiguation)
William Daniel (disambiguation)